Kelly Kruger (born November 12, 1981) is a Canadian actress. She is best known for playing Mackenzie Browning on The Young and the Restless. She also played the recurring role of Eva on The Bold and the Beautiful.

Early life
She was born and raised in Montreal, Quebec, and speaks French fluently. She was raised Jewish.

Career
At 17, Kelly was discovered by Elite Models while visiting her family in Los Angeles. She worked with multiple teen magazines, Macy’s, Sebastian Hair and others. After working as a model, she began pursuing her real passion of acting. Kelly landed a lead role in the feature film Vampire Clan.
Kruger appeared on the CBS daytime soap opera, The Young and the Restless as Mackenzie Browning, from February 2002 to July 2003. Kruger also appeared in several movies, as well as one episode each of the TV series Knight Rider and Blue Mountain State. Kelly has appeared on Hit shows such as Entourage, Bones, Criminal Minds, Castle, and Rizzoli & Isles.

In 2014, it was announced that Kruger had joined the cast of The Bold and the Beautiful, as a day player. Kruger will make her debut as Eva, in an episode as part of the show's location shoot in Paris, in August 2014. Kelly Kruger continues to recur as Eva.

In 2017, Kruger played villainess Joelle in the Lifetime film, Girls Night Out.

On March 9, 2018, it was announced by the Soap Opera Digest that Kruger is returning to The Young and the Restless as Mackenzie, the role that she last played in 2003.

Personal life
In 2010, Kruger began dating former Days of Our Lives actor Darin Brooks. In February 2014, they partnered with an organization called Aid Still Required. On March 21, 2016, she and Brooks got married. In April 2019, it was announced that she and Brooks are expecting their first child. The couple's first child was born on September 22, 2019.

Filmography

Film

Television

References

External links 
Official Website
Soapcentral.com biography

1982 births
Living people
21st-century Canadian actresses
Actresses from Montreal
Canadian film actresses
Canadian soap opera actresses
Canadian television actresses